Afghanistan participated in the 1996 Summer Paralympics in Atlanta, United States. It was the country's first participation in the Paralympic Games. Afghanistan was represented by two athletes, Gul Afzal and Zabet Khan, who both competed in road cycling. Neither athlete won a medal.

See also
1996 Summer Paralympics
Afghanistan at the Paralympics
Afghanistan at the 1996 Summer Olympics

External links

Nations at the 1996 Summer Paralympics
1996
Summer Paralympics